Kamala Selvaraj is an obstetrician and gynecologist from Tamil Nadu, India. Born to Tamil film actor Gemini Ganesan, she commissioned the first test tube baby of South India in August 1990. In 2002 she was awarded PhD for her thesis on "Premature Ovarian Failure and its management". She was also awarded the "Best Lady Doctor Award-1993" and "Rajiv Gandhi Memorial National Integration Award-1995". More than 800 babies have been born as a result of assisted reproduction therapy conducted by her hospital.

Education 
She studied at Sacred Heart Matriculation Higher Secondary School, Presentation convent, Church Park, Chennai. Did her Pre - University at Stella Maris College, Chennai in 1961, MBBS at Kasturba Medical College, Karnataka from 1962 - 1967, Junior & Senior housemanship at Madras General Hospital from 1968 - 1970, MD at Madras Medical College, Madras University from 1976 - 1978, DGO at Madras Medical College, Madras University from 1971 - 1972. Joined Teaching Cadre and served Govt. Hospital for Women & Children, Egmore, Chennai and Ph.D in Reproductive Physiology. Awarded as the First Research Scholar in Reproductive Physiology in Tamil Nadu by Dr MGR Medical University, Chennai in September 2001.

Speciality training
Dr Kamala Selvaraj has undergone training in the following Specialities
 Training in In Vitro Fertilization & Embryo Transfer at Monash University, Australia in 1985 & 1988.
 Training in Micro Surgery & Tubal RecanalisationXII world conference on Sterlity, National University Hospital, Singapore in 1986.
 Refresher Training in IVF & ET (Hands on Practicals & Lectures, Assisted Reproduction Technology on National University Hospital, Singapore in May 1991.
 Post Congress Workshop in Advances in Operative Training in Laparoscopy & Hysteroscopy at Bali Islands, Indonesia in September 1991.
 Training in Micromanipulation ICSI Workshop at Bali Islands, Indonesia in October 1995.
 Attended Workshop & Advanced Training in Blastocyst Culture at National University Hospital, Singapore in May 1995.
 Training in Advanced Gynaecological Laparoscopic Surgery & Basic Suturing (Hands on Workshop, Lectures & Demonstrations) at National University Hospital, Singapore in June 2001.

Published journals and articles

Journal of Obstetrics & Gynaecology of India
 Role of Laparoscopic Electrocoagulation of Ovarian Surface (LEOS) in PCOD and its outcome - Vol 52, No 2, March - April 2002.
 A spontaneous successful second pregnancy in an established case of Premature Ovarian Failure -  May/June 2003.
 Comparison of Clomiphene Citrate & Letrozole for Ovulation Induction and resultant pregnancy outcome - Nov/Dec 2004. (Prize winning Article Rs.8000/-)

Fertility & Sterility (international journal) 
 Successful pregnancy in a patient with a 46, XY Karyotype - Vol 78, No 2, August 2002 Issue.
 Two interesting cases of Ovarian pregnancy after In Vitro Fertilization / Embryo Transfer and its successful Laparoscopic Management - Vol 92, No 1 - July 2009.

Published book 
Editor and Author for the book titled 100 Questions & Answers for Obstetrics and Gynaecology, Vol I, II - Published by IJCP - 2009.

 Published materials 
 Book titled Wonder of Motherhood, English & Tamil.
 Handbook on Intra Uterine Insemination.
 Book titled Thaayaaga Naaneruppan, English & Tamil.
 Religious Book Mana Amaithikku Uthavum Aanmeegam, English & Tamil.

Achievements
 Established Fertility Research Centre (1989) at GG Hospital with Assisted Reproduction Technology.
 Programmed INDIA'S THIRD and SOUTH INDIA'S FIRST Test Tube Baby by IVF - ET in 1990.
 First Surrogate Baby of India in 1994. 
 Programmed & Delivered the First Baby in India by her own concept of FROOTI Technique in Assisted Reproduction in 1995.
 South East Asia's FIRST TWINS born to a patient with Mayer - Rokitansky - Kuster - Hauser Syndrome through a Surrogate on 19 January 2001.
 India's first IVF - ET Baby to a 55year old woman in 2002.
 Achieved South India's first Highest number of successful Test Tube Baby deliveries from 1989 by Assisted Reproduction Technology and has declared it through conducting a press meet & delivering a lecture on Test Tube Babies - Assisted Reproduction Technology at Hotel Park.
 South India's first Test Tube Ms. Kamala Ratnam delivered a female baby through Normal Conception which is first of its kind in India on 10 July 2014.

 Professional memberships (national and international) 
 International Membership in American Society for Reproductive Medicine (ASRM)
 Indian Medical Association - Life Member.
 Indian Society of Assisted Reproduction (ISAR)
 Indian Association of Gynaecological Endoscopists (IAGE) - Life Member.
 Indian Society for Prenatal Diagnosis (ISPAT) - Life Member.
 Federation of Obstetric & Gynaecological Societies of India (FOGSI)
 Obstetrics & Gynaecological Society of Southern India (OGSSI) - Life Member.
 Life Member of Indian Society for the study of Reproduction & Fertility in the year 1997.
 Chairperson of ISAR 2015', 20th National Conference of Indian Society for Assisted Reproduction.

Awards received 
 Rajiv Gandhi Unity Award - 20 August 1991.
 Indian Medical Association South Madras, Doctor's Day Award (1995)
 For the sake of Honour Award by Rotary Club of south East RI Dist 3230 - 29 November 1995.
 Award for Distinguished Medical Service by State Women's Forum, Madras - 17 February 1996.
 Seva Ratna Award instituted by Centenarian Trust for her outstanding service to the community on 14 April 2001 in the presence of Mahaswami Sri Jayendra Saraswathi & Vijayendra Saraswati of Kancheepuram.
 Jeevan Bharathi Award in September 2005, on International Women's Day by LIC of India for her achievement in the field of Medicine.
 Was bestowed the most outstanding women of the year for her immeasurable contribution to the field of Medicine by Tchaikovsky Music Club of Russian Culture Center, Chennai - 6 March 2006.
 Women Empowerment Award - Central Government Welfare Association, Shastri Bhavan - 19 April 2011.
 Best Motherhood Award, Ajanta Fine Arts - 30 May 2011.
 Sigaram Thotta Pengal, Vijay TV - 2012.
 Lifetime Achievement Award, Dr MGR University.
 Women Extraordinaire Award, Only Success - 12 February 2014.
 Best Doctor Award, Women & Child Foundation - 1 July 2015.
 Femina Super Mom & Daughter Award - 13 February 2016.

References 

Indian gynaecologists
Indian women gynaecologists
20th-century Indian women scientists
Indian obstetricians
Medical doctors from Chennai
Living people
20th-century Indian medical doctors
Women scientists from Tamil Nadu
20th-century women physicians
Year of birth missing (living people)